Munojot Yolchiyeva (born 1960), also known under the Russian form of her name, Munadjat Yulchieva, is the leading performer of classical Uzbek music and its Persian-language cousin Shashmaqâm. She is famous for the unique quality of her voice and her natural charisma. She is recognized as People's artist of Uzbekistan (1994). She is honored as the Heorine of Uzbekistan (2021).

Professional career 

Yolchiyeva was born in 1960 in the Buloqboshi district of Andijan region in Ferghâna valley near Tashkent, and from an early age it was obvious she had a great gift as a singer. This nearly resulted in her being channelled into a career as an opera singer, but she was inexorably drawn towards the slow, aching music of her own ancient culture, something that seemed almost pre-ordained by her name, which means 'ascent to God' or simply 'prayer'.

She is frequently accompanied by her mentor, the famous rubab player, Shawqat Mirzaev . Her repertoire includes many of his compositions, and she usually performs with his ensemble. Typically the group use local instruments such as the dutar (two stringed lute), the tanbur (3-stinged lute), a gidjak spike fiddle, doira frame drum, ney flute and at times the chang zither. Those lucky enough to attend one of her rare concerts abroad will witness a sumptuously dressed performer of startling gravitas and charisma, with long pigtails trailing down to her waist.

In 1997, she won the International Music Festival . In 2005, she performed at the Austrian Music Festival Glatt und Verkehrt.

Only two recordings of her music are widely available – the first for the French label Ocora (1994) and the most recent (1997) on Germany's Network label, which has the subtitle A Haunting Voice.

Further reading

KOCIEJOWSKI, Marius. The Pebble Chance: Feuilletons & Other Prose (Biblioasis, 2014) contains a chapter on her, "A Singer from Ferghana".

External  links
  
 BBC Radio 3: Awards for World Music 2004
 Weltmusikwelt: Gesänge von der Seidenstrasse
 Муножот Йўлчиева / Munojot Yo'lchiyeva – Ushshoq / Ушшоқ
 Munojat Yo'lchiyeva konserti 19 06 09

1960 births
Living people
21st-century Uzbekistani women singers
People from Fergana Region
20th-century Uzbekistani women singers